Yamadu Bani Dunbia (1917-2002) was a notable djembe master drummer from Bamako, Mali. Although recordings of his playing are scarce, he was well known across Bamako. He recorded his first songs at the age of 78.

Biography 

Dunbia was born in 1917 in west Mali and served in the French colonial army during the World War II. After the war he found himself in the Malian capital Bamako. After the Malian independence in the 60's, the celebration culture in Bamako boomed, and Dunbia became a well known performer, keeping his reputation until 2002 when he died.

His first recordings were made in 1995 when he was 78. The recordings were made in a school yard in Bamako without rehearsals, notation or similar and in a single shot. Yet the music recorded is of significant importance to students of West African music.

Discography 

 1995 - The Art of Jenbe Drumming: The Mali Tradition Vol. 1
 1998 - Jakite, Dunbia, Kuyate, and Samake: Bamakò Fòli: Jenbe Music From Bamako (Mali)

References

Further reading 

Eric Charry, "A Guide to the Jembe," originally published in "Percussive Notes" 34, no. 2 (April 1996).
Polak, Rainer (1998)"Jenbe Music in Bamako: Microtiming as Formal Model and Performance Practice"., p. 23-42.

External links 
 Microtiming
 Original article

African drummers
Master drummers
1917 births
2002 deaths
People from Bamako